Cigaritis trimeni is a butterfly in the family Lycaenidae. It is found in Angola, the Democratic Republic of the Congo, Tanzania, Malawi and Zambia. The habitat consists of savanna.

Subspecies
Cigaritis trimeni trimeni (Zambia, northern Malawi, western Tanzania)
Cigaritis trimeni congolanus (Dufrane, 1954) (Angola, Democratic Republic of the Congo: Sankuru and Lualaba)

Etymology
The name honours Roland Trimen.

References

External links
Die Gross-Schmetterlinge der Erde 13: Die Afrikanischen Tagfalter. Plate XIII 69 g

Butterflies described in 1910
Cigaritis